The Macaluso Sisters is a 2020 Italian drama film co-written and directed by Emma Dante, based on her own 2014 play of the same name. It was entered in the main competition at the 77th Venice International Film Festival.

Plot
Following the sudden death of one of them during childhood, the four Macaluso sisters experience trauma and grief in their entire lives.

Cast

Production
Principal photography began in March 2019 in Palermo, Sicily.

Release
The film had its world premiere at the 77th Venice International Film Festival on 9 September 2020. It was released in Italy on 10 September 2020 by Teodora Film.

References

External links
 
 

2020 films
2020 drama films
Italian drama films
2020s Italian-language films
Films set in Palermo
Films set in the 1980s
Films shot in Palermo
Italian films based on plays
Films about sisters
Films about grieving
Films about child death
Lesbian-related films
Italian LGBT-related films
2020 LGBT-related films
LGBT-related drama films
2020s feminist films
2020s Italian films